This is a list of episodes for the TBS sitcom Are We There Yet?. The series premiered on June 2, 2010.

Episode titles of Are We There Yet? always start with "The" and end with "Episode" referencing a plot point or quirk in the episode.

Series overview

Episodes

Season 1 (2010)

Season 2 (2011)

Season 3 (2012–13)
Are We There Yet? returned for a third and final season on September 17, 2012. New episodes were shown every weekday at 12pm on TBS. As of October 1, 2012, they are now being shown at 9:30am. Two episodes from Season 2 were premiered this season.

References

General references

External links
 

Lists of American sitcom episodes